Nanquan may refer to:

 Nanquan (martial art), a family of martial arts from Southern China
 Nanquan Puyuan (c. 749–c. 835), Chán (Zen) Buddhist master in China during the Tang Dynasty
 Nanquan Temple, a Buddhist temple in Xiangyin County, Hunan, China
 Nanquan, a town in Shifang, China